Ivana Puzar (born 28 July 1981) is a Croatian female professional basketball player.

External links
Profile at eurobasket.com

1981 births
Living people
Basketball players from Šibenik
Croatian women's basketball players
Small forwards
Power forwards (basketball)